Romola Helen Louise Costantino, Mrs Enyi   (14 September 1930November 1988) was a noted Australian pianist, accompanist and teacher, who also worked as a music, film and theatre critic.

Biography
Costantino was the daughter of Napoleone Costantino (1889–1982), an Italian civil servant in Australia, and his Wales-born wife, Rosamond Lindner (1898-1963). She studied at the NSW Conservatorium of Music under Alexander Sverjensky.

She was a graduate of the Royal College of Music in London, where her graduation performance was the Rhapsody on a Theme of Paganini by Rachmaninoff.

She gave many broadcasts and recitals for the ABC, most notably as an accompanist for musicians such as Ruggiero Ricci and Henryk Szeryng (on his 4th and last Australian tour in 1984).

Costantino gave the first solo piano recital in the Sydney Opera House (10 April 1973 to an invited audience). She also participated in the first public performance in the Opera House's Music Room (with the Carl Pini Quartet and Walter Sutcliffe, under the auspices of Musica Viva Australia). She also formed a well known piano duo with Lance Dossor.

She was a member of the inaugural committee of the Accompanists' Guild of South Australia in 1983, and was President of the Guild from 1984 to 1986.

She recorded Schubert's Arpeggione Sonata with Robert Pikler, viola, and Mozart's Kegelstatt Trio with Pikler and Pamela Johnson, clarinet. She also recorded two Schubert piano sonatas that had been left unfinished by Schubert and completed by Walter Dullo. Other recordings include Ravel's La valse, and pieces by Debussy and Fauré., as well as a Telemann trio sonata for the (long-defunct) AWA record label in which she played the clavichord.

She was a senior lecturer at the University of Sydney. She was also a music critic for the Sydney Morning Herald. and a film and theatre critic for the Sun-Herald.

Personal life
In 1971, Romola Costantino married George Enyi, an artist and sculptor, and sometimes used her married name Romola Enyi.

She was musical consultant for the film Between Wars (1974).

Honours
In the New Year's Day Honours of 1978, she was appointed an Officer of the Order of the British Empire for her services to the arts.

Death
Romola Costantino died in 1988 in Adelaide, South Australia, aged 58, from cancer. Many of her programs and other papers are held at the National Library of Australia.

References

1930 births
1988 deaths
20th-century classical pianists
20th-century women pianists
Australian accompanists
Australian classical pianists
Australian film critics
Australian music critics
Australian music educators
Australian theatre critics
Australian women educators
Australian women pianists
Australian women music critics
Classical accompanists
Piano pedagogues
Women film critics
Women music educators
Women theatre critics
Sydney Conservatorium of Music alumni
Australian Officers of the Order of the British Empire
Deaths from cancer in South Australia